This is a list of all personnel changes for the 2012 NBA off-season and 2012–13 NBA season.

Retirement

Front office movements

Head coach changes
Off-season

Season

General manager changes
Off-season

Player movement
The following is a list of player movement via free agency and trades.

Trades

Free agency

Free agency negotiation started on July 1, 2012, with players being able to sign starting July 11, after the July moratorium ended. All players are unrestricted free agents unless indicated otherwise. A restricted free agent's team has the right to keep the player by matching an offer sheet the player signs with another team.

Released

Waived

Note
 * Released under the amnesty clause in the CBA, which gives teams a one-time option to waive a player's remaining contract from the salary cap.

Training camp cuts
All players listed did not make the final roster.

D-League assignments
Each NBA team can assign players with two years or less of experience to its affiliated NBA Development League team. Players with more than two years of experience may be assigned to the D-League with the players' consent.

Note
Numbers in parentheses indicates the number of assignments a player has received during the season.

Going overseas

Draft

2012 NBA draft
The 2012 NBA draft was held on June 28, 2012, at Prudential Center in Newark, New Jersey.

First round

Second round

Previous years draftees

Notes

References

External links

2012–13 season transactions at NBA.com
2012 Free Agent Tracker at NBA.com
NBA Transactions at ESPN.com
2012–13 D-League Assignments at NBA.com

Transactions
2012-13